The Millet motorcycle, designed in 1892 by Félix Théodore Millet, may have been the first motorcycle (or motorized bicycle) to use pneumatic tires.  It had an unusual radial-configuration rotary engine incorporated into the rear wheel, believed to be the first one ever used to power a person-carrying vehicle of any type.

Production history
A prototype with rear-wheel rotary engine ran in 1892. Production rights were acquired by Alexandre Darracq in 1894. Production halted following an unsuccessful entry in the Paris–Bordeaux–Paris race of 1895.

Technology
The five cylinders were mounted radially in the rear wheel, with the connecting rods directly attached to the fixed crank of the hollow-drilled rear axle. The rear fender served as a fuel tank; a surface carburetor and air filter were located between the wheels. Ignition was electric via combination Bunsen cell and induction coil. Millet used a rotating handlebar twistgrip for its operation. It was started with pedals so the motorcycle could be moved even after engine failure. With the rated continuous power, the bike should have reached a speed of 35 km/h.

See also
List of motorcycles of the 1890s

References

Vehicles introduced in 1892
Motorcycles introduced in the 1890s
Motorized bicycles
Motorcycles powered by rotary engines
Motorcycles of France